Evolutionary theory was a peer-reviewed scientific journal covering all aspects of evolutionary biology. It was established in 1973 and published until 2003 by the University of Chicago. The founding editor-in-chief was Leigh Van Valen, later joined by Melissa Stoller.

References

English-language journals
Publications established in 1973
Evolutionary biology
Publications disestablished in 2003